Saat Hindustani is a 1969 Indian action film written and directed by Khwaja Ahmad Abbas. The film portrays the heroic story of seven Indians who attempt to liberate Goa from the Portuguese colonial rule. The cast included Madhu, Utpal Dutt, Shehnaz, A. K. Hangal, Anwar Ali (brother of Indian comedian Mehmood), and Amitabh Bachchan who made his debut with this film.

Overview
Saat Hindustani portrays the story of seven Indians who attempt to liberate Goa from the Portuguese colonial rule.

Synopsis
A Muslim poet Anwar Ali from Bihar and five other men, all belonging to different religions and parts of India, join their seventh comrade Maria, a native of Portuguese-occupied Goa, to raise nationalist sentiments in the state by hoisting Indian flags on Portuguese forts and buildings.

Cast

Madhu as Shubodh Sanyal
Amitabh Bachchan as Anwar Ali 
Shehnaaz as Maria (as Shahnaz)
Utpal Dutt as Joginder Nath
Irshad Ali as Mahadevan
Anwar Ali as Ram Bhagat Sharma
Jalal Agha as Sakharam Shinde
A. K. Hangal as Doctor
Dina Pathak as Mrs. J. Nath
 Prakash Thapa as Tax Inspector
Kanu Sarswat

Production

Crew 
Direction - Khwaja Ahmad Abbas
Story - Khwaja Ahmad Abbas
Screenplay - Khwaja Ahmad Abbas
Dialogue - Khwaja Ahmad Abbas
Production - Khwaja Ahmad Abbas
Producer - Manmohan Sabir
Production Secretary - N. M. Trivedi
Cinematography - S. Ramachandra
Editing - Mohan Rathod
Audiography - Minoo Bawa, B. P. Bharucha
 sp. Back Ground Music Recording Satish J Kaushik
Music Direction - J. P. Kaushik
 asst. Sunil Kaushik
Lyrics - Kaifi Azmi
Playback Singer - Mahendra Kapoor
Audiographer - Minoo Bawa
Audiographer - B.P. Bharucha

Awards
National Film Awards
Nargis Dutt Award for Best Feature Film on National Integration
National Film Award for Best Lyrics -Kaifi Azmi

References

External links
 Box Office India
 
 Malayalam Actor Madhu on his experience in Saat Hindustani

1969 films
1960s Hindi-language films
1960s Urdu-language films
1969 war films
Best Film on National Integration National Film Award winners
Films directed by K. A. Abbas
Films set in Goa
Goa liberation movement
Indian Army in films
Indian war films
Cultural depictions of Jawaharlal Nehru